The Appraisal Standards Board (ASB) develops, interprets and amends the Uniform Standards of Professional Appraisal Practice (USPAP). The ASB is composed of seven appraisers who are appointed by the Board of Trustees of The Appraisal Foundation. Activities of the Board are directed by the Chair, who is appointed by the Board of Trustees for a one year term. The ASB exercises all authority over the subject, style, and content of USPAP and its other communications. It also performs all functions of The Appraisal Foundation with respect to establishing, improving, fixing and promulgating uniform standards of professional appraisal practice.

Board members

2017 Board Members

Previous members

External links
 2018–2019 USPAP online version

Real estate in the United States
Real estate valuation